Huddersfield Town's 1970–71 campaign was Town's first season in the Football League's top division since the 1955–56 season, following their successful previous season in Division 2. They finished in 15th place, but only 9 points clear of the relegation zone. They had some brilliant results during the season, including a 2–1 win over champions and FA Cup winners Arsenal, and were top of the table after wins over Blackpool and Southampton. Their top position lasted only one more season, followed by their dramatic slide in the 1971–72 season.

Squad at the start of the season

Review
After a successful previous season, Town started their Division 1 lives with convincing 3–0 & 3–1 wins over Blackpool & Southampton respectively. Those wins actually put Town top of the table, but they were soon put back into place with a 4–0 drubbing by Liverpool at Anfield. They had a pretty mixed season, but they were never in any danger of being dragged into a relegation dogfight. One of their most impressive wins was a 2–1 win over Arsenal in January 1971. Goals by Les Chapman and Frank Worthington in between a Ray Kennedy equalizer gave Town a win over the eventual league and FA Cup winners.

Town finished in 15th place, despite only winning 11 games all season. They had 36 points, but never looked like getting relegated or fighting for a European place.

Squad at the end of the season

Results

Division One

FA Cup

Football League Cup

Appearances and goals

1970-71
English football clubs 1970–71 season